Painkiller Jane is a science fiction and action television series based on the comic book character of the same name. Airing on the Sci Fi Channel in the US starting April 13, 2007 and Global in Canada, it starred Kristanna Loken as the title character. The show was canceled after one season of 22 episodes.

Plot
The series stars Loken as Jane Vasco. She begins as a DEA agent, where in the course of her work she encounters Andre McBride (Rob Stewart), who is the leader of a team of agents working for an unspecified government agency. The team is based in a disused subway station named Deckard Street. She is forced to join the team after she probes too far into their operations. It is then revealed that the team's mission is to identify and neutralize "neurological aberrants" ("neuros") – human mutants with supernormal mental powers. Dialogue in the pilot states there are dozens of variations, and the reasons neuros use their abilities vary. It is then theorized that the aberrations interfere with the brain's ability to distinguish right from wrong.

During the pilot episode, Vasco discovers that she has superhuman abilities – supernormal regenerative powers bordering on invulnerability. This is realized when she is pushed through a forty-story window and falls to her apparent death, only to later revive and recover completely. However, she still feels the pain of her injuries before they heal. The team's doctor, Seth Carpenter, identifies her abilities as not like those of the neuros they track, but "something else".

Cast
 Kristanna Loken as Jane Vasco – the show's protagonist.
 Rob Stewart as Andre McBride – the leader of the special team.
 Stephen Lobo as Dr. Seth Carpenter – a doctor/scientist working with the team.
 Noah Danby as Connor King – the "muscles" of the team; a field operative with a short fuse.
 Sean Owen Roberts as Riley Jensen – a computer and communication technology specialist working for the team.
 Nathaniel Deveaux as Joe Waterman – former subway caretaker working for the team.
 Alaina Huffman as Maureen Bowers – Jane's best friend and former DEA partner.

Episodes

Production
The TV series received a 22-episode production order after the 2005 Painkiller Jane TV-movie yielded positive results. The film differed significantly from the original comic's storyline; the TV series, in turn, discarded the film's back-story and started afresh. According to story creator Jimmy Palmiotti, the new series was "closer to the original concept we came up with in the comic".  Executive producer Gil Grant has said the new series is "partly true" to the original comic, but will still differ to some extent.

The series credits include several people in the role of producer. Most are credited only for a few episodes. This includes Loken (the star), who is credited as co-executive producer for several episodes.

The TV series was filmed at Insight Film Studios in Maple Ridge, British Columbia, Canada and various locations around the Lower Mainland of British Columbia. The final four episodes were filmed and set in Budapest, Hungary.

See also
 List of television programs based on comics

References

External links
 PKJ Files
 Painkiller Jane at TVGuide.com
 
 
 

Syfy original programming
2000s American science fiction television series
2000s Canadian science fiction television series
2007 American television series debuts
2007 American television series endings
2007 Canadian television series debuts
2007 Canadian television series endings
Global Television Network original programming
Television shows based on comics
Television shows filmed in Vancouver
Painkiller Jane
Television series about mutants